The 2018–19 St. Louis Blues season was the 52nd season for the National Hockey League franchise that was established on June 5, 1967. The Blues were in last place in the league in January, but rallied to make the playoffs. They advanced to the finals against the Boston Bruins and won in seven games for their first Stanley Cup in the franchise's 52-year history.

The Blues were the fourth St. Louis-based pro sports team to win a major championship, joining the eleven-time World Series Champion St. Louis Cardinals of Major League Baseball, the 1957–58 St. Louis Hawks of the NBA, and the 1999 St. Louis Rams of the NFL. This made St. Louis the eighth city to win a championship in each of the four major U.S. sports.

Off-season
On May 30, 2018, the Blues named Mike Van Ryn as assistant coach, replacing Darryl Sydor, who stepped down to spend more time with his family. Van Ryn played the first three seasons (2000–2003) of his eight years in the NHL with the Blues, scoring 13 points in 69 games.

The Blues extended their affiliation with the Tulsa Oilers of the ECHL on May 31.

Season summary
The Blues started the season sluggish, and head coach Mike Yeo was fired on November 19 with the team's record at 7–9–3. Craig Berube, who had served as assistant coach with the Blues since 2017, was named the interim head coach. St. Louis began the 2019 calendar year with the worst record in the league; 15–18–4 and 34 points recorded. Soon after, rookie goaltender Jordan Binnington joined the team. On January 7, he won his first game in a shutout and took over as the team's starting goaltender. The Blues then went on a franchise-record 11-game winning streak and had a 30–10–5 run to finish the season. They clinched a playoff spot on March 29, 2019.

In the playoffs, the Blues defeated the Winnipeg Jets, Dallas Stars, and San Jose Sharks to advance to the 2019 Stanley Cup Finals, where they faced the Boston Bruins. It was their first Finals appearance since 1970. On May 29, 2019, St. Louis won a Stanley Cup Finals series' game for the first time in franchise history after getting swept in three previous series (1968–1970), as they defeated the Bruins 3–2 in overtime in game 2. On June 12, 2019, they defeated the Bruins in seven games to win the first Stanley Cup title in franchise history. Until then, they were the oldest franchise to have never won a Stanley Cup.

Ryan O'Reilly, who had been acquired in a trade during the previous offseason, was the Blues' top regular season scorer with 77 points. He then had a franchise-record 23 playoff points and won the Conn Smythe Trophy as the most valuable player in the playoffs. O'Reilly also won the Frank J. Selke Trophy for the league's best defensive forward during the regular season.

"Gloria"
St. Louis had been in last place in the NHL on January 3. On the night of January 6, a few Blues players were in a Philadelphia bar watching the National Football League "Double Doink" wildcard game between the Philadelphia Eagles and Chicago Bears. The DJ played the 1982 Laura Branigan song "Gloria", and according to defenceman Joel Edmundson, "this one guy looked at the DJ and said, 'Keep playing "Gloria"!' so they kept playing it. Everyone would get up and start singing and dancing. We just sat back and watched it happen. Right there we decided we should play the song after our wins." The following day, goaltender Jordan Binnington made his first start for the Blues that season and won the game with a shutout.

The team played it after every win for the rest of the regular season and playoffs, and as their hot streak continued, the song became popular in the city of St. Louis. "Gloria" was written on signs and t-shirts. The St. Louis radio station KYKY-FM played it for 24 hours straight after series victories in the playoffs.

Standings

Divisional standings

Conference standings

Schedule and results

Preseason
The preseason schedule was published on June 15, 2018.

Regular season
The regular season schedule was released on June 21, 2018.

Playoffs

The Blues faced the Winnipeg Jets in the First Round of the playoffs and defeated them in six games. Next up, they faced the Dallas Stars in the Second Round of the playoffs, defeating them in seven games. Then, they faced the San Jose Sharks in the Conference Finals of the playoffs, defeating them in six games.

Finally, they faced the Boston Bruins in the Stanley Cup Finals, defeating them in seven games to win their first Stanley Cup.

Player statistics
As of June 12, 2019

Skaters

Goaltenders

†Denotes player spent time with another team before joining the Blues. Stats reflect time with the Blues only.
‡Denotes player was traded mid-season. Stats reflect time with the Blues only.
Bold/italics denotes franchise record.

Transactions
The Blues were involved in the following transactions during the 2018–19 season.

Trades

Free agents

Waivers

Contract terminations

Retirement

Signings

Draft picks

Below are the St. Louis Blues' selections at the 2018 NHL Entry Draft, which was held on June 22 and 23, 2018, at the American Airlines Center in Dallas, Texas.

Notes:
 The Toronto Maple Leafs' first-round pick went to the St. Louis Blues as the result of a trade on June 22, 2018, that sent Winnipeg's first-round pick in 2018 (29th overall) to Toronto in exchange for a third-round pick in 2018 (76th overall) and this pick.

References

St. Louis Blues seasons
St. Louis Blues
Blues
Blues
Western Conference (NHL) championship seasons
St. Louis
Stanley Cup championship seasons